Malafaia is a surname. Notable people with the surname include:

Ricardo Malafaia (born 1981), Portuguese footballer
Silas Malafaia (born 1958), Brazilian televangelist

Portuguese-language surnames